Patrick "Pat" McGrath (born 1953) is an Irish retired hurler who played as a midfielder for the Waterford senior team.

Born in Waterford, McGrath first made an impression on the inter-county scene at the age of seventeen when he linked up with the Waterford minor team, before later joining the under-21 side. He joined the senior panel for the 1970 championship. McGrath went on to play a key role for Waterford for sixteen years, however, he enjoyed little success during his inter-county career. He was a Munster runner-up on two occasions.

As a member of the Munster inter-provincial team at various times throughout his career, McGrath won two Railway Cup medals. At club level he is a seven-time championship medallist with Mount Sion.

Throughout his career McGrath made 16 championship appearances for Waterford. His retirement came following the conclusion of the 1986 championship.

McGrath's sons, Eoin and Ken, also played with Waterford.

On 2 April 2014 McGrath was inducted into the GAA Hall of Fame.

Honours

Player

Mount Sion
Waterford Senior Club Hurling Championship (7): 1972, 1974, 1975, 1981, 1983, 1986, 1988

Waterford
Munster Under-21 Hurling Championship (1): 1974 (c)

Munster
Railway Cup (3): 1976, 1978, 1981 (sub)

Individual

Awards
GAA Hall of Fame (1): 2014

References

1953 births
Living people
Mount Sion hurlers
Waterford inter-county hurlers
Munster inter-provincial hurlers